Heneage Finch, 2nd Earl of Aylesford (1683–1757) was a British peer and member of the House of Lords, styled Lord Guernsey from 1714 to 1719.

Origins
He was the son and heir of Heneage Finch, 1st Earl of Aylesford (died 1719).

Career
From 1704 to 1705, he represented Maidstone in the British House of Commons, and was knight of the shire for Surrey from 1710 to 1719. He was the Master of the Jewel Office from 1711 to 1716.

Marriage and children

He married Mary Fisher (1690 – 28 May 1740), daughter and heiress of  Sir Clement Fisher, 3rd Baronet (died 1729) of Packington Hall, Great Packington, Warwickshire, by his wife Ann Jennens. They had children including:
Heneage Finch, 3rd Earl of Aylesford, eldest son and heir.
Mary (1717-16 March 1803) married William Howard, Viscount Andover. They had one son, and three daughters.
Frances (died 1761), married in 1741 William Courtenay, de jure 7th Earl of Devon, 1st Viscount Courtenay (1710–1762) of Powderham Castle, Devon.

Sources
Dictionary of National Biography, Finch, Heneage, first Earl of Aylesford (1647?–1719), by E. T. Bradley. Published 1889.

References

|-

1683 births
1757 deaths
Finch, Heneage
Guernsey, Heneage Finch, Lord
Guernsey, Heneage Finch, Lord
2
Finch, Heneage
Guernsey, Heneage Finch, Lord
Heneage
Masters of the Jewel Office